Geiger, is a border town in South Sudan.  It is notable for the refugee crisis from South Sudan into Sudan due to the South Sudanese Civil War.  It is situated along the White Nile.

References 

Populated places in Upper Nile (state)